MA Wadud (August 1, 1925 – August 28, 1983) was a Bangladeshi language activist and politician. He was one of the founding members of Awami Muslim League (later Bangladesh Awami League). He was awarded Ekushey Padak in 2013 posthumously by the Government of Bangladesh for his involvement in Bengali Language Movement in 1952. He was the father of Dipu Moni, the current Education Minister of Bangladesh.

Political career
Wadud was the founder member of Gonotrantik Jubo League in 1948, East Pakistan Muslim League in 1948, East Pakistan Awami Muslim League in 1949, Weekly Ittefaq in 1949, The Daily Ittefaq in 1953 and Kendrio Kachi Kachar Mela in 1956.

Wadud was imprisoned for involvement in language movement in 1948 and 1952 and again for refusing the charge of the ministry of military government in 1978.

He was the general secretary of the student political organization East Pakistan Chhatra League from 1953 to 1954.

Personal life
His daughter Dipu Moni also a politician and minister who is a Doctor by profession. His son Jawadur Rahim Wadud Tipu, a diabetic foot surgeon in profession.

References

1925 births
1983 deaths
People from Chandpur District
Awami League politicians
Recipients of the Ekushey Padak
Sheikh Mujibur Rahman family